Relentless Reckless Forever is the seventh album by Finnish melodic death metal band Children of Bodom, released on 8 March 2011 through Spinefarm Records, Fearless Records and Nuclear Blast. It is the first Children of Bodom album to not have a song with "Bodom" in the title.

Background
Relentless Reckless Forever was recorded at Finland's Petrax Studios, during August and September 2010. "We worked super hard on this album, at least for me it was pretty much no sleep or rest for six weeks," stated lead vocalist/guitarist Alexi Laiho. "But we were determined to make the best COB album ever, so we were willing to do whatever it took. Of course, having our producer Matt Hyde kicking our asses 24/7 definitely made the results even better, so obviously we're more than anxious to get this album out there."

The song "Ugly" starts with a quote from the television show House, taken from episode 12 of season 6 titled "Remorse". The quote is, "You're feeling something, what is it, what do you feel? I don't know, it hurts. It will."

A music video has been shot for the single "Was It Worth It?" with skateboarder Chris Cole as well as noted pro skaters Jamie Thomas, Garrett Hill and Tom Asta.

"The single 'Was It Worth It?' is a total party song," said Laiho. "It's not your typical Bodom sound, but it's one of my favorites and heavy as hell." The video was shot in Pennsylvania's residential Action Sports compound Camp Woodward and it was directed by Dale Resteghini for Raging Nation Films.

Regarding the subject matter covered in the "Pussyfoot Miss Suicide" lyrics, Laiho told Revolver, "I've been involved with stupid chicks who were trying to get attention by being, 'Oh, I'm so fucking depressed. I'm gonna slit my wrists with a cheese grater...' And it's so fucking boring, like, 'Just let it go. You're really not gonna do it, anyway.' It's kind of harsh, but it's fuckin' black humor." "Ugly", on the other hand, is "really just venting and screaming stupid stuff. Nobody should expect anything deep and poetic and sensitive and intelligent, y'know?"

The single "Was It Worth It?" was made available for streaming on 13 January via Facebook, and "Ugly" was broadcast for the first time on 4 February 2011 on FullMetalJackie's radio show.

The album is available in several editions: CD, CD+DVD Limited Digipak, Vinyl LP and limited Super Deluxe Edition including a CD, DVD and a 64-page photobook. The Japanese editions are pressed in SHM-CD format, feature three bonus tracks, include lyrics translation in Japanese and a poster is offered with the first press edition.

Relentless Reckless Forever was certified gold (sold over 10,000 copies) in Finland on the first day of its release, 9 March.
As of 10 March, the album had sold over 100,000 copies worldwide.

In retrospect the members of Children of Bodom later refer to Relentless Reckless Forever as their least favorite album. Both Alexi and Janne Wirman both have stated that Matt Hyde frequently tried to push the band into a more stripped down sound closer aligned to bands from the new wave of American heavy metal scene, which Children of Bodom were willing to experiment with at the time but later felt such a style was not for them. On Children of Bodom's follow up albums Halo of Blood and I Worship Chaos the band reintroduced more power metal and black metal elements to their melodic death metal sound, abandoning the thrash metal elements of Relentless Reckless Forever.

Track listing

The DVD coming with some editions fulfils:
"Was It Worth It?" [Music Video]
Making of "Was It Worth It?"
"Angels Don't Kill" – Live at Bloodstock
"Everytime I Die" – Live at Bloodstock
The Rockhouse Method With Alexi Laiho – DVD Trailer
The Rockhouse Method With Alexi Laiho – Instructional DVD Excerpt

Chart performance

Personnel

Children of Bodom
Alexi Laiho – lead vocals, lead guitar
Roope Latvala – rhythm guitar, backing vocals
Jaska Raatikainen – drums
Henkka Seppälä – bass guitar, backing vocals
Janne Wirman – keyboards

Additional performers
James-Paul Luna (ex-White Wizzard) – clean vocals on "Party All the Time"
DJ Kreisipastori – additional keyboard programming on "Party All The Time"

Production
Produced by Matt Hyde and Children of Bodom
Arranged by Children of Bodom
Recorded by Matt Hyde and Chris Rakestraw, except keyboards, recorded by Janne Wirman
Mastered by Tom Baker at Precision Mastering, USA, October 2010

Release history

References

External links
 Official album website

2011 albums
Children of Bodom albums
Fearless Records albums
Nuclear Blast albums
Spinefarm Records albums
Albums produced by Matt Hyde